Edward Milner  (20 January 1819 – 26 March 1884) was an English landscape architect.

Early life and career

Edward Milner was born in Darley, Derbyshire, the eldest child of Henry Milner and Mary née Scales.  Henry Milner was employed at Chatsworth by William Cavendish, 6th Duke of Devonshire, as a gardener and porter.  Edward was educated at Bakewell Grammar School and was then apprenticed to Chatsworth's head gardener, Joseph Paxton.  In 1841 he continued his studies in Paris at the Jardin des Plantes and returned home to become Paxton's assistant.  He worked with Paxton in developing and managing Princes Park, Liverpool and assisted him at Osmaston Manor in Derbyshire. In 1847 he laid out the Italian Garden at Tatton Park, Cheshire, which had been designed by Paxton. When Paxton re-erected The Crystal Palace in Penge Park, Sydenham in 1852, Milner was appointed as the superintendent of works.  He also worked for Paxton in creating the People's Park, Halifax for Francis Crossley.

Independent career

From the mid-1850s, Milner worked as an independent landscape gardener.  He received commissions for work in England and Wales, including designing three public parks in Preston, Lancashire. These parks were constructed as part of a scheme for relieving unemployment caused by the cotton famine in the 1860s. He also designed gardens in Germany and Denmark.  In 1881 he became principal of the Crystal Palace School of Gardening, established by the Crystal Palace Company.

Works as an independent designer

This is an incomplete list.

Personal life

In 1844 he married Elizabeth Mary Kelly of Liverpool with whom he had 11 children.  The family moved to Norwood, London, and later to Dulwich Wood Park.  Milner appointed his son Henry Ernest as his principal assistant. Edward Milner founded the garden design and landscape architecture firm of Milner-White. He died at his home in 1884 leaving an estate valued at slightly over £8,000 (£ today).

References

Further reading

1819 births
1884 deaths
People from Darley Dale
English gardeners
English landscape architects